Andrew Hallam is a personal finance author and speaker from Canada. He was formerly a middle school teacher in Comox, British Columbia.

Hallam's book Millionaire Teacher (Wiley 2011, 2017) is about becoming a millionaire on a teacher's salary. He also wrote The Global Expatriate’s Guide To Investing (Wiley 2014) and Millionaire Expat (Wiley 2018).

References

External links

Living people
Canadian financial writers
Canadian male non-fiction writers
Year of birth missing (living people)